Soodla is river in Estonia in Harju and Lääne-Viru County. The river is 72.6 km long and basin size is 221.5 km2. It runs into Jägala river.

There live also trouts and Thymallus thymallus.

See also
List of rivers of Estonia

References

Rivers of Estonia
Landforms of Harju County
Landforms of Lääne-Viru County